Christopher Andrew Joannou (born 10 November 1979)  is an Australian musician best known as the bassist for the Newcastle-based alternative rock band Silverchair. He is a twin to sister Louise Kipa. He was the first of the three band members to cut his long hair short. Joannou was nicknamed 'Lumberjack' by Silverchair fans for his love of trees, and plaid shirts. His bandmate Ben Gillies taught him how to play bass guitar.

As well as being a well known bassist, Joannou was the assistant producer for The Mess Hall albums Feeling Sideways and the ARIA award-winning Notes From A Ceiling.

He has used mainly G&L and Fender Precision Basses, and almost exclusively uses Ampeg B-15 Portaflex combos. As reported to gearwire.com, Joannou uses an Ampeg SVT-2 into an Ampeg 810 cabinet and a new Ampeg B-15 combo in his live set-up.

In 2006, Joannou spoke at the launch of a mental health scholarship set up to honour his cousin, Nathan Trepezanov, who had committed suicide at the age of 21 in January of that year. Joannou is of Macedonian heritage.

Business ventures 

Joannou is a co-founder and co-owner of the Lovells Lager beer company. He is also one of four businessmen who opened a bar and small entertainment venue on Parry Street in the West End of Newcastle, NSW, Australia, which opened in December 2013.

References

1979 births
Living people
People from Newcastle, New South Wales
Silverchair members
Australian twins
Australian people of Macedonian descent
Slavic speakers of Greek Macedonia
Australian rock bass guitarists
Male bass guitarists
Alternative rock bass guitarists
21st-century bass guitarists
Australian male guitarists